FC Gießen is a German association football club from the city of Giessen and the Watzenborn-Steinberg quarter of the town of Pohlheim, both in Hesse. The club's greatest success has been promotion to the tier four Regionalliga Südwest in 2016 and 2019.

History

Predecessor club Sportclub Teutonia Watzenborn-Steinberg was formed on 1 November 1927. For much of its history this club played in local amateur leagues.

From the mid-2000s, the club experienced a rise through the league system, reaching the tier five Landesliga Hessen-Mitte in 2006 after a runners-up finish in the Bezirksoberliga Gießen/Marburg. Teutonia played at this level for two seasons before being relegated again in 2008. It returned to what had now been renamed the Gruppenliga Gießen/Marburg, where it played for the next three seasons. A league championship in 2011 took it back up to the Verbandsliga Hessen-Mitte, the former Landesliga. It played at Verbandsliga level for the next four seasons before winning the league in 2015 and earning promotion to the Hessenliga for the first time. Winning the league in 2015–16 Teutonia earned another promotion, now to the Regionalliga Südwest, from which the club was relegated one season later.

Teutonia was renamed FC Gießen on 1 July 2018 after acquiring VfB Gießens football department. VfB announced its closure earlier in March. FC won another Hessenliga championship in 2019, promoting them to the Regionalliga again.

Current squad

Honours
The club's honours:
 Hessenliga Champions: 2016, 2019
 Verbandsliga Hessen-Mitte Champions: 2015
 Gruppenliga Gießen/Marburg'
 Champions: 2011

Recent seasons 
The recent season-by-season performance of the club:

 With the introduction of the Regionalligas in 1994 and the 3. Liga in 2008 as the new third tier, below the 2. Bundesliga, all leagues below dropped one tier.

References

External links 
Official team site 
FC Gießen at Weltfussball.de 

Football clubs in Germany
Football clubs in Hesse
Association football clubs established in 1927
1927 establishments in Germany
Sport in Giessen